Graham Everett (born December 23, 1947) is an American poet, professor, publisher, musician, and artist.

Early life and education 
Everett was born in Oceanside, New York, the son of James H. and Jacqueline (Vaughn) Everett. He received a bachelor's degree in English from Canisius College, and a master's degree and doctorate in English from the State University of New York at Stony Brook.

He married Elyse Arnow in 1981. They have a son, Logan.

Career 
Everett founded Street Press in 1974 and published books, chapbooks, and broadsides for a variety of poets, mostly from Long Island, including Vince Clemente, Michelle Cusumano, Richard Elman, Ray Freed, Dan Giancola, Jack Micheline, Annabelle Moseley, Dan Murray, Allen Planz, R.B. Weber, and Claire White. He was also the founding editor of Street magazine.

Everett served as the interim director of the Poetry Center at the State University of New York at Stony Brook.

Everett was a faculty member in the General Studies Program at Adelphi University, where he taught classes in critical reading and writing, expository writing, and the world of ideas. He was named Long Island Poet of the Year by the Walt Whitman Birthplace Association in 2015.

In 1996, he joined the poetry band Middle Class, with Everett on microphone, Janene Gentile on bass, Demoy Shilling on guitar, and Raymond Kruse on drums. Everett wrote the lyrics to their songs. The name of the band was a nod to the group members' economic class and middle age.

As an artist, Everett is a collagist and a prolific producer of mail art.

In 2006 he donated his archive to Stony Brook University.

Bibliography

Poetry collections
Casting Bones from a Turtle Shell, Street Press, 1977
Rural Gardenia, TK Press, 1977
Nothing Left to Fake: A Great American 4 Page Novel, The Black Hole School of Poethnics, 1978
The Trees, Street Press, 1978
Strange Coast, Tamarack Editions, 1979
The Sunlit Sidewalk, Tamarack Editions, 1985
Minus Green, Yank This Press, 1992
Minus Green Plus, Breeze/Street Press, 1995
The Doc Fayth Poems, Street Press/Mongrel, 1998
Corps Calleux, Street Press, 2000
That Nod Toward Love: New Poems, Street Press, 2006
An Incomplete Dictionary of Disappearing Things, Street Press, 2012

Broadsides
"Trees," Street Press, 1976
"Farewell to the Decade & Liberty Avenue," Black Hole School of Poethnics, 1980
"Letter to Everywoman," Banjo Press, 1978
"This Could Be Plutonium," Ukulele Press, 1978
"Winding the Alarm Clock," Banjo Press, 1979
"Facing 1984" (private, 1984)

Co-edited anthologies
Paumanok Rising: An Anthology of Eastern Long Island Aesthetics, edited by Vince Clemente and Graham Everett. NY: Street Press, 1982
Writing Workshop Anthology No. 1, edited by Allen Planz and Graham Everett. Backstreet Editions, 1982.
The Light of City and Sea: An Anthology of Suffolk County Poetry, edited by Daniel Thomas Moran, et al. Street Press, 2006.

References

1947 births
Living people